Miss Rwanda 2016, the sixth edition of the Miss Rwanda pageant, was held on February 27, 2016 at Camp Kigali Grounds in the province of Kigali.

The winner, Jolly Mutesi succeeded Doriane Kundwa, Miss Rwanda 2015. She entered Miss World 2016 but she did not place. This is the first time Rwanda has competed in the Miss World contest. The first runner up, Peace Ndaruhutse Kwizera, won the title of Miss Naiades 2016.

Miss Heritage Rwanda, Jane Mutoni, has finished 1st runner-up at Miss Heritage Global 2016.

Results

Special Awards 
Miss Congeniality - Ariane Uwimana (Eastern Province) 
Miss Photogenic - Peace Ndaruhutse Kwizera (Kigali)
Miss Popular - Sharifa Umuhoza (Northern Province)
Miss Heritage - Jane Mutoni (Kigali)

Contestants

Crossovers 
Contestants who previously competed at other national beauty pageants:

Miss Rwanda
2014 : Kigali: Vanessa Mpogazi
2015 : Kigali: Vanessa Mpogazi
2015 : Western Province: Balbine Umutoni (4th Runner-up)

Miss Elegancy Rwanda 
2016 : Southern Province: Doreen Karake Umuhoza (2nd Runner-up) 
2016 : Eastern Province: Marie d'Amour Rangira Uwase (1st Runner-up) 

Miss High School
2014 : Western Province: Balbine Umutoni (Winner)

Contestants who previously competed or will be competing at international beauty pageants:

Miss World   
2016: Western Province: Jolly Mutesi

Miss Heritage Global 
2016: Kigali: Jane Mutoni (1st Runner-up)

Miss Naiades 
2016: Kigali: Peace Ndaruhutse Kwizera (Winner)

References

External links
Official website

2016
2016 in Rwanda
2016 beauty pageants